Bring Me Home is a 2019 South Korean drama thriller film written and directed by first-time director Kim Seung-woo and stars Lee Young-ae and Yoo Jae-myung. It debuted in the Discovery program of 2019 Toronto International Film Festival.

Plot
Jung-yeon (Lee Young-ae) has been searching relentlessly for her son since he disappeared six years ago. One day, she suddenly receives an anonymous tip-off about his whereabouts that leads her to a fishing village.

Cast 
 Lee Young-ae as Jung-yeon
 Yoo Jae-myung as Police corporal Hong
 Park Hae-joon as Myung-gook
 Lee Won-keun as Seung-hyun

Supporting roles 
 Kim Gook-hee as Jin-wook's mother
 Kim Yi-kyung as Nurse
 Lee Hang-na as Ahn Kyung-ja

References

External links
 
 

2019 films
South Korean thriller drama films
2010s South Korean films